Městský stadion, also known as Městský stadion v Horním parku (formerly known as Stadion v Husových sadech), is a multi-purpose stadium in Znojmo, Czech Republic. It is mainly used for football matches and is the home ground of 1. SC Znojmo. The stadium has a capacity of 2 599 people.

References
 Městský stadion at 1. SC Znojmo website
 Stadium profile at vysledky.cz
 https://int.soccerway.com/teams/czech-republic/1-sc-znojmo/venue/

Football venues in the Czech Republic
1. SC Znojmo
Multi-purpose stadiums in the Czech Republic
Buildings and structures in Znojmo
Sports venues completed in 1952
1952 establishments in Czechoslovakia
20th-century architecture in the Czech Republic